Ghesquière is a surname. Notable people with the surname include: 

Geoffrey Ghesquière (born 1989), Belgian footballer
Nicolas Ghesquière (born 1971), French fashion designer, creative director for Balenciaga
Régis Ghesquière (1949–2015), Belgian decathlete

de:Ghesquière